Robert Harbin (born Edward Richard Charles Williams; 12 February 1908 – 12 January 1978) was a British magician and author. He is noted as the inventor of a number of classic illusions, including the Zig Zag Girl. He also became an authority on origami.

Career
The young Edward first got interested in magic after an unknown ex-serviceman appeared at his school with a magic show later described as "rather poor". Williams came to London at the age of 20 and began by working in the magic department of Gamages toy shop. He began performing in music halls under the title "Ned Williams, the Boy Magician from South Africa". By 1932 he was appearing in the Maskelyne's Mysteries magic show in various London theatres. He was the first British illusionist to move from stage performing to television, appearing in the BBC TV show Variety in 1937 and numerous times after the war when the BBC resumed broadcasting. He developed a number of new tricks, including the Neon Light and the now ubiquitous Zig Zag Girl. His lesser known inventions include the Aztec Lady, The Blades of Opah, and Aunt Matilda's Wardrobe.

Much of his inventive genius was put into written form and he is known as one of the most prodigious authors on the subject of magical effects. However, although Harbin was brilliantly creative in the field of magic he was not a particularly good writer and his friend and associate Eric C Lewis has stated that many of Harbin's titles were ghost written for him.

In 1953 Harbin appeared in a minor part as a magician in the film The Limping Man, produced by Cy Endfield.  In 1953, Harbin and a friend of Endfield, Gershon Legman (1917–1999), discovered a common interest in the Japanese art of paper-folding.  Harbin wrote many books on the subject, beginning with Paper Magic (illustrated by the young art student, the Australian Rolf Harris who in the middle of the project, caught the origami idea and contributed several intricate models himself) in 1956, and was the first President of the British Origami Society.  He was the first Westerner to use the word origami for this art-form.  He also presented a series of origami programmes for ITV in its "Look-In" magazines for children in the 1970s.
 
There is a commemorative plaque dedicated to Harbin at Golders Green Crematorium in London.

Publications

On origami
Paper Magic: The art of paper folding, Oldbourne, 1956, ASIN B0000CJG8R
Paper Folding Fun, Oldbourne, 1960, ASIN B0000CKUYQ
Secrets of Origami, old and new: The Japanese art of paper-folding, Oldbourne, 1963, ASIN B0000CM4YW
Teach Yourself Origami, Hodder, 1968, 
Origami 1: The Art of Paper-Folding, Coronet, 1969, 
More Origami, The art of paper-folding no.2, Hodder, 1971, 
Origami 2: The Art of Paper-Folding, Coronet, 1971, 
Origami 3: The Art of Paper-Folding, Coronet Books/Hodder, 1972, 
Secrets of Origami, Octopus, 1972,  
Origami: Art of Paper Folding (Teach Yourself), Hodder, 1973, 
Origami - A Step by Step Guide, Hamlyn, 1974, 
Have Fun with Origami, ITV, 1975, 
Origami: Art of Paper Folding (Illustrated Teach Yourself), Picture Knight, 1975, 
Origami A/H, Hodder Arnold, 1976, 
Origami 4, Robert Harbin, 1977, 
Have Fun with Origami, Severn Ho., 1977, 
Origami: Art of Paper Folding (Coronet Books), Hodder Headline Australia, 1977, 
New Adventures in Origami, 1982, Harper & Row,

On magic
Something New in Magic, Davenport, 1929
Psychic Vision, Davenport, 1930
Six Card Creations, Davenport, 1930
Demon Magic, Davenport, 1938
How to Be a Wizard, Oldbourne, 1957, ASIN B0000CJUT3
How to Be a Conjuror, Sphere, 1968, 
Magic of Robert Harbin, C.W. Mole and Sons, 1970 – This was published with a run of only 500 copies, after which Harbin had the plates destroyed.
Magic (Illustrated Teach yourself), Treasure, 1983, 
Magic (Illustrated Teach Yourself), Knight, 1976, 
The Harbin Book, M. Breese, 1983, 
 Harbincadabra, brainwaves and brainstorms of Robert Harbin [i.e. N. Williams]: From the pages of Abracadabra, 1947–1965, R. Harbin
Magic Marches On (Harbin's fabled "Lost Book") included in Davenport Story Series – Vol 2, Davenport

Other subjects
Waddington's Family Card Games, Elm Tree, 1972, 
Waddington's Family Card Games, Pan, 1974, 
Party Lines, Oldbourne, 1963, ASIN B0000CLQIH
Instant Memory: The Way to Success, Corgi, 1968,

References

Further reading
 Eric C. Lewis, The Genius of Robert Harbin: A Personal Biography, Mike Caveney's Magic Words (1997),

External links

Robert Harbin page at Whirligig 1950s TV Nostalgia site

 (video)

1909 births
1978 deaths
British magicians
Origami artists
Deaths from cancer in England
Golders Green Crematorium
Academy of Magical Arts Creative Fellowship winners
Academy of Magical Arts Masters Fellowship winners